Lê Duy Mật (1738–1767) was a Vietnamese rebel leader who was active in the 18th century.

Mật was a son of Emperor Lê Dụ Tông. In 1738, he planned a plot against the Trịnh lord together with two princes, his brother Lê Duy Quý and Lê Duy Chúc (son of Lê Hy Tông), but failed. They had to flee, and hid somewhere in Thanh Hóa.

In 1740, Mật launched a rebellion against the Trịnh lords in Thanh Hóa. He attacked Hưng Hóa and Sơn Tây. He was defeated by the Trịnh army, retreated to Nghệ An, then to Muang Phuan, and occupied Trình Quang Mountain as his base area. In 1764, he sought aid from Nguyễn Phúc Khoát, but was refused because the Nguyễn lords did not want to engage in conflict with the Trịnh lords.

In 1767, Trịnh Doanh died, and his son Trịnh Sâm succeeded him as the head of the Trinh lords. Hearing the news, Mật attacked Thanh Chương and Hương Sơn, but was defeated. In 1769, he was defeated by the Trịnh army. He set fire to the fort and committed suicide.

See also
Nguyễn Hữu Cầu
Nguyễn Danh Phương
Hoàng Công Chất

References

Khâm định Việt sử Thông giám cương mục
Việt Nam sử lược
Danh nhân quân sự Việt Nam, Nhiều tác giả, Nhà xuất bản Quân đội nhân dân, 2006
Biên niên lịch sử cổ trung đại Việt Nam, Viện Sử học, Nhà xuất bản Khoa học xã hội Hà Nội, 1987

1770 deaths
Vietnamese rebels
Vietnamese princes
People of Revival Lê dynasty
Suicides in Vietnam
Suicides by self-immolation
1738 births
18th-century suicides